RAF Little Horwood was established during World War II, and is located on the site of Greenway Farm in Aylesbury Vale, north east Buckinghamshire. The airfield sits within a triangle formed by Little Horwood, Great Horwood, and Winslow. It was in operation from September 1942 until January 1946. It is now mostly returned to agricultural use.

History
The airfield was established as a base for Operational - Replacement Training Units to train recruits for combat and also for "nickelling", the dropping of propaganda leaflets. The airfield went operational on 2 September 1942 and served as a satellite for RAF Wing.

The runway was built of rubble from bomb damaged London. Wellington Bombers from No. 26 OTU arrived along with OTU Gunnery section and the 92 Group Communications flight to commence the basic training of recruits.

No. 1684 OTU Bomber Defence Training Flight moved to Little Horwood on 5 June 1943 and simulation battles were undertaken using Tomahawk aircraft. Flying ended at Little Horwood on 30 November 1945 with the remnants of No. 26 OTU remaining until January 1946.

On 7 August 1943, a Wellington Bomber X3790 from the airfield crashed into Winslow town centre killing four crew and 13 civilians.

The site has been subject to several major development proposals in recent years, but these have not been well received locally and have all been rejected.

References

Royal Air Force stations in Buckinghamshire
Royal Air Force stations of World War II in the United Kingdom